The Club Hielo Jaca also known as Aramón Hielo Jaca by sponsorship reasons is a Spanish ice hockey team that currently plays in the country's professional league, the Liga Nacional de Hockey Hielo. They have won 13 league championships, most recently in 2016, being the most laureated ice hockey team in Spanish Hockey League. They play their home games at Jaca, Aragon, Spain.

Current roster 

-->

-->

-->

-->

-->

-->

-->

-->

-->

-->

-->

|}

Achievements 

Spanish Hockey League:
Winners (13): 1984, 1991, 1994, 1996, 2001, 2003, 2004, 2005, 2010, 2011, 2012, 2015, 2016
Copa del Rey (Ice Hockey):
Winners (14) : 1985, 1988, 1989, 1993, 1995, 1996, 1998, 2000, 2001, 2002, 2003, 2006, 2011, 2012

External links
  CH Jaca (official page)
  CH Jaca

Ice hockey teams in Spain
Sport in Aragon
Ice hockey clubs established in 1972
1972 establishments in Spain